Tame may refer to:

Taming, the act of training wild animals
River Tame, Greater Manchester 
River Tame, West Midlands and the Tame Valley
Tame, Arauca, a Colombian town and municipality
"Tame" (song), a song by the Pixies from their 1989 album Doolittle
TAME (IATA code: EQ), flag carrier of Ecuador
tert-Amyl methyl ether, an oxygenated chemical compound often added to gasoline
1,1,1-Tris(aminomethyl)ethane, polyamine chelating ligand
Tame.it, a context search engine for Twitter
Tame, a variety of the Idi language of Papua New Guinea
Tame (surname), people with the surname
Tame Impala, the psychedelic music project of Australian multi-instrumentalist Kevin Parker.